Maurice Cacheux (6 September 1913 – 13 October 1980) was a French racing cyclist. He rode in the 1937 Tour de France.

References

1913 births
1980 deaths
French male cyclists
Place of birth missing